Ningmute Township (Mandarin: 宁木特镇) is a township in Henan Mongol Autonomous County, Huangnan Tibetan Autonomous Prefecture, Qinghai, China. In 2010, Ningmute Township had a total population of 9,677: 4,865 males and 4,812 females: 2,619 aged under 14, 6,552 aged between 15 and 65 and 506 aged over 65.

References 

Township-level divisions of Qinghai
Huangnan Tibetan Autonomous Prefecture